In enzymology, a D-sorbitol dehydrogenase (acceptor) is an enzyme that catalyzes the chemical reaction

D-sorbitol + acceptor  L-sorbose + reduced acceptor

Thus, the two substrates of this enzyme are D-sorbitol and acceptor, whereas its two products are L-sorbose and reduced acceptor.

This enzyme belongs to the family of oxidoreductases, specifically those acting on the CH-OH group of donor with other acceptors.  The systematic name of this enzyme class is D-sorbitol:acceptor 1-oxidoreductase. This enzyme is also called D-sorbitol:(acceptor) 1-oxidoreductase.  This enzyme participates in fructose and mannose metabolism.  It employs one cofactor, FAD.

References

 

EC 1.1.99
Flavoproteins
Enzymes of unknown structure